The 1942 NCAA Wrestling Championships were the 15th NCAA Wrestling Championships to be held. Michigan State University in East Lansing, Michigan hosted the tournament at Jenison Fieldhouse.

Oklahoma A&M took home the team championship with 31 points and having four individual champions.

David Arndt of Oklahoma A&M was named the Outstanding Wrestler.

Team results

Individual finals

References

NCAA Division I Wrestling Championship
Wrestling competitions in the United States
1942 in American sports
1942 in sports in Pennsylvania